Federal Highway 160D is a toll highway primarily located in Morelos. It functions as a spur of Mexican Federal Highway 95D to the city of Cuautla. The road is operated by Caminos y Puentes Federales, which charges a toll of 54 pesos per car to travel Highway 160D.

Route description
Highway 160D begins at an interchange with Highway 95D just after the La Pera curve and proceeds past a toll plaza at its first exit, serving Tepoztlán. It winds southeast to exit at Oacalco and Oaxtepec before continuing to its end point on the north side of Cuautla, where travelers can take Mexican Federal Highway 115 or continue on Highway 160 toward Izúcar de Matamoros, Puebla.

History
In February 2017, a modernization project began that will widen Highway 160 from two to four lanes.

References 

Mexican Federal Highways